The Wolf River is a  long tributary of the Fox River in northeastern Wisconsin in the Great Lakes region of the United States. The river is one of the two National Scenic Rivers in Wisconsin, along with the St. Croix River. The river and its parent the Fox River and associated lakes are known for their sturgeon which spawn every spring upstream on the lower river until blocked by the Shawano Dam. The river flows through mostly undeveloped forestland southerly from central Forest County in the north to Lake Poygan (west of Lake Winnebago) in the south. The lake is part of the Winnebago Pool of lakes fed by both the Fox and Wolf Rivers. The Fox-Wolf basin is usually considered to be a single unified basin and the rivers themselves may be referred to as the Fox-Wolf River system.

The river is known in the Menominee language as Mahwāēw-Sēpēw, "wolf river".

Course

The Wolf River rises in the southern Headwaters Wilderness of the Nicolet unit of Chequamegon-Nicolet National Forest, with the northernmost fork stemming from the confluence of Wildcat Creek and Pine Creek at Pine Lake in west central Forest County. The river flows south through Langlade and Menominee counties, where whitewater rafting is well known. Menominee County is mostly within the boundaries of the federally recognized Menominee Indian Reservation.  Next the Wolf River flows through Shawano County, where it collects the Red River, passes by the city of Shawano. It then flows through Waupaca and Outagamie counties and back into Waupaca County, where it collects the Embarrass River and the Little Wolf at the city of New London.  The Wolf River then collects the Waupaca River, then flows through Partridge Lake. The river then flows through Winnebago County and into Lake Poygan and Lake Winneconne. It finally goes through the village of Winneconne to empties into Lake Butte des Morts on the Fox River.

Hydrology
Principal tributaries of the river include Wildcat Creek and Pine Creek (headwaters), Pine River, Rat River, Waupaca River, Little Wolf River, Embarrass River, Shioc River, Red River, Evergreen River, Lily River, Hunting River.

The river drains into the Fox River at Lake Butte des Morts then via the Fox River into Lake Winnebago and thence into lower Green Bay of Lake Michigan. Lake Michigan drains northerly via the Straits of Mackinac into Lake Huron then south and east through the Great Lakes waterways into the St. Lawrence River, which flows northeasterly into the Gulf of St. Lawrence on the Atlantic Ocean.

Ecology
Environmentalists were concerned about preserving the river when the Crandon mine was proposed near a tributary of the river. The Crandon Mine was purchased by the Sokaogon Mole Lake Chippewa Band tribe in 2003 to prevent development that would adversely affect the river. The campaign to stop the Crandon Mine on the Wisconsin's Wolf River was the result of successful coalition-building efforts amongst Wisconsin's indigenous groups, environmentalists, and rural citizens.

Restoration of sturgeon spawning
Two dams on the upper Wolf River block sturgeon from returning to their historic spawning grounds at Keshena Falls on the Menominee Reservation: the Shawano Dam 125 mi. upstream from Oshkosh, Wisconsin and Balsam Row Dam 5.5 miles above the Shawano Dam, both constructed in the late 1800s.  The result was that for over 100 years no sturgeon (or other fish) spawned in the waters above the Shawano Dam.  Starting in 2012, the WDNR in conjunction with the Menominee tribe, implemented a sturgeon capture and relocation program to populate the river above the dams with mature sturgeon.  Eggs and young fish were also used to achieve a breeding population of sturgeon in Legend Lake, a 1304 acre lake in Menominee County.  Sturgeon successfully spawned at the falls the following year.  The tribe has proposed that fishways be constructed around both dams to allow spawning from populations in Lake Winnebago.  However, due to concerns about aquatic invasive species and Viral hemorrhagic septicemia (VHS), a deadly fish disease, the proposal has not yet been implemented, and the capture and relocation program has continued.

Zebra Mussels
Zebra mussels (Dreissena polymorpha) are small, freshwater, bivalve shellfish native to the Caspian and Black Seas south of Russia and Ukraine. They can clog water intakes and pipes, encrust piers, boats and motors, and cut the feet of swimmers. Zebra mussels have been found in less than 5% of Wisconsin lakes predicted to be suitable for zebra mussels. However, they were detected in the Winnebago Pool including the Wolf River as early as 1999.

Flora and Fauna

Fishing
There are many different species of fish in the river. In 2016, the Wisconsin state record Quillback was caught in the Wolf River.

Sturgeon
The Winnebago system, including Wolf and Fox Rivers and associated lakes, is home to the largest population of Lake Sturgeon in the world.
The sturgeon which spawn annually in the springtime in the Wolf River and its parent, the Fox River, between approximately April 15 and May 5, as they swim upstream from Lake Winnebago. It is estimated that the extent of the Lake Sturgeon has dropped to about one-tenth of its population in the state since year 1800. This species, which has existed since the time of the dinosaurs (100 million years ago), has a viable naturally reproducing population, which are highly prized for the taste of their flesh, and also for their eggs.  Female sturgeon deposit their eggs only about every four to six years, starting at 20 years old, up to their life span of 50 years. At this age, the sturgeon are five feet long. The fish spawn in the shallows of the Wolf river, as they swim upstream.

In order to protect the spawning locations of the sturgeon from poaching when the fish are the most vulnerable, the Wisconsin Department of Natural Resources formed a citizen sturgeon guard called Sturgeon For Tomorrow in the early 1990s. They volunteer to watch over the spawning sites during the spawning season.

Walleye
The walleye is very popular during their spawning period, during the spring. Many fishermen set out to catch their daily limit. The walleye is probably the most prized fish on the river.

White bass
The white bass or sand bass (Morone chrysops) is a freshwater fish of the temperate bass family Moronidae that also spawns in the Wolf River. While different fishing methods and techniques are used, the most common is the river rig (also known as the Wolf River rig).

Points of interest
Two towns named for the river are on the river: Wolf River, Winnebago County and Wolf River, Langlade County.

See also
 List of rivers of Wisconsin
 Shawano Lake
 Menominee Indian Reservation

References

Rivers of Wisconsin
Wild and Scenic Rivers of the United States
Rivers of Winnebago County, Wisconsin
Rivers of Forest County, Wisconsin
Rivers of Menominee County, Wisconsin
Rivers of Shawano County, Wisconsin
Rivers of Waupaca County, Wisconsin
Rivers of Outagamie County, Wisconsin